Firefox is a 1984 shoot 'em up arcade video game based on the 1982 Clint Eastwood movie of the same name.  It was produced in 1984 as Atari, Inc.'s only LaserDisc video game. Like Atari's first-person Star Wars and Empire Strikes Back, Firefox came as both an upright and sit down cabinet with a yoke style controller.

Development
To collect the LaserDisc video, developers Mike Hally and Moe Shore sifted through 20 to 30 hours' worth of footage shot for the film. Most of the resulting footage was first-person shots filmed from helicopters flying over Greenland and Scandinavia.

Reception
In Japan, Game Machine listed Firefox on their April 1, 1984 issue as being the third most-successful upright/cockpit arcade unit of the month. In the United States, it was the top-grossing laserdisc game on the Play Meter arcade charts in July 1984.

See also
 Astron Belt
 M.A.C.H. 3

References

External links
 
 Firefox from Arcade-History.com
 Firefox from AtariHQ.com 

1984 video games
Arcade video games
Arcade-only video games
Atari arcade games
Combat flight simulators
LaserDisc video games
Video games based on films
Video games developed in the United States